Vranjska is a village in the municipality of Bosanska Krupa, Bosnia and Herzegovina. The village is located in the north-western region of Bosnia and is a 30 kilometer drive from the city of Bihać, Bosnia and Herzegovina.

Demographics 
According to the 2013 census, its population was 124, all Serbs.

References

Populated places in Bosanska Krupa